A concert aria is normally a free-standing aria or opera-like scene (scena) composed for singer and orchestra, written specifically for performance in concert rather than as part of an opera. Concert arias have often been composed for particular singers, the composer always bearing that singer's voice and skill in mind when composing the work.

Apart from only denoting arias for singer and orchestra, the term is also used to indicate arias which were specifically composed as insertion arias for already-existing operas, either as additions to the score or as substitutions for other arias. These are sometimes performed in concerts because they are no longer required for their original purpose, though they were not, strictly speaking, composed for performance in concert.

The concert arias which are most commonly performed today were written by Wolfgang Amadeus Mozart, but there are many examples by other composers, such as:
"Son qual nave ch'agitata" by Riccardo Broschi (written for the famous castrato Farinelli)
"Ermina" by Juan Arriaga
"Ah! perfido" by Ludwig van Beethoven
"Der Wein" for soprano and orchestra by Alban Berg
"Scena di Berenice" by Joseph Haydn
"Infelice!" by Felix Mendelssohn

Mozart concert arias 

Among the more well-known of Mozart's concert arias are:

"Popoli di Tessaglia!", K. 316, for soprano, with its two famous G notes (i.e., the G above high C - according to the Guinness Book of Records, the highest musical note ever scored for the human voice) that come shortly before the end. This aria was composed in order to be inserted into Gluck's opera Alceste, and also specifically to showcase the superlative vocal skills of Mozart's sister-in-law, Aloysia Weber, who was only 18 at the time. Sopranos who are able to cope with the aria's demands have been few and far between, and the aria is usually omitted from performances of Alceste. It has been therefore redesignated a concert aria, to be presented in concerts by such rare singers as are able to deliver its fiendishly difficult coloratura.
, K. 383, for soprano.
"Ch'io mi scordi di te?", K. 505, written for Nancy Storace
"Vorrei spiegarvi, oh Dio!", K. 418, written for Aloysia Weber
"Bella mia fiamma", K. 528, written for Josepha Duschek
"Per questa bella mano", K. 612, for bass, double bass obbligato, and orchestra

References 
Notes

Sources

Further reading
 

Musical terminology